Western Assyrian may refer to:

 someone or something related to western regions of Assyria, in historical or geographical sense
 someone or something related to Western Assyrians, in the context of modern Assyrian terminology
 someone or something related to Western Assyrian dialects (in modern Assyrian terminology), including:
 Turoyo language, a Neo-Aramaic language spoken in the Tur Abdin region, southeastern Turkey, and in northeastern Syria
 Mlahsô language, a critically endangered Neo-Aramaic language that was spoken in southeastern Turkey and northeastern Syria

See also
 Assyria (disambiguation)
 Assyrian (disambiguation)
 Eastern Assyrian (disambiguation)
 Assyrian language (disambiguation)